The Great Trinity Forest is a forested urban park located on the southern outskirts of the heavily urbanized area of southern Dallas, Texas, and it is recognized as the largest urban forest in the United States.

Description

Nature
The Great Trinity Forest urban park is located within the Texas Blackland Prairies ecoregion. Habitats within it include bottomland hardwood forests, riparian zones, wetlands, open water ponds, grasslands, and the Trinity River itself.

References

External links

Parks in Dallas
Trinity River (Texas)
Forests of Texas